Antti Munukka (born 3 March 1982) is a Finnish international referee who refereed at 2014 FIFA World Cup qualifiers.

References

External links 
 
 
 
 

1982 births
Living people
Finnish football referees
UEFA Europa League referees